Sleaze Freak is the second studio album by heavy metal band Scum of the Earth. The album was released October 23, 2007.

The album sold about 800 copies its first week, failing to chart on the Billboard 200.

Track listing

Disc 1
Bombshell from Hell - 3:16 
Hate X 13 - 3:31
Sleaze Freak - 3:02
Devilscum - 3:02
Death Stomp - 1:19
I Am Monster - 3:38
Love Pig - 3:14
Macabro Expectaculo - 3:38
Corpse Grinders - 2:12
The Devil Made Me Do It 2 - 2:35
Scum-O-Rama - 1:08
13 Freaks - 3:15
Tracks 13-22 are silence.
Just Like Me - 5:01

Disc 2
Bonus DVD Content [TBC]

Personnel
 Mike Riggs - Vocals, guitar
 Clay Campbell - Bass
 Skyla Talon - Guitar
 Ivan de Prume - drums

References

2007 albums
Scum of the Earth (band) albums